Vodafone Group Plc is a British multinational telecommunications company. Its registered office and global headquarters are in Newbury, Berkshire, England. It predominantly operates services in Asia, Africa, Europe, and Oceania.

, Vodafone owns and operates networks in 21 countries, with partner networks in 47 further countries. Its Vodafone Global Enterprise division provides telecommunications and IT services to corporate clients in 150 countries.

Vodafone has a primary listing on the London Stock Exchange and is a constituent of the FTSE 100 Index. The company has a secondary listing on Nasdaq.

Name
The name Vodafone comes from voice data fone (the latter a sensational spelling of "phone"), chosen by the company to "reflect the provision of voice and data services over mobile phones".

History
The evolution of Vodafone started in 1981 with the establishment of the Racal Strategic Radio Ltd subsidiary of Racal Electronics, the UK's largest maker of military radio technology, which formed a joint venture with Millicom called 'Racal', which evolved into the present Vodafone.

As a Racal Telecom brand: 1980 to 1991

In 1980, Ernest Harrison, the then chairman of Racal Electronics, agreed to a deal with Lord Weinstock of the General Electric Company to allow Racal to access some of GEC's tactical battlefield radio technology. The head of Racal's military radio division, Gerry Whent, was briefed by Ernest Harrison to drive the company into commercial mobile radio. Whent visited a mobile radio factory run by General Electric (unrelated to GEC) in Virginia, US, the same year to understand the commercial use of military radio technology.

Jan Stenbeck, head of a growing Swedish conglomerate, set up an American company, Millicom Inc, and approached Gerry Whent in July 1982 about bidding jointly for the UK's second cellular radio licence. The two struck a deal giving Racal 60% of the new company, Racal-Millicom Ltd, and Millicom 40%. Due to concerns of the British government about foreign ownership, the terms were revised, and in December 1982 the Racal-Millicom partnership was awarded the second UK mobile phone network licence. Final ownership of Racal-Millicom Ltd was 80% Racal, with Millicom holding 15% plus royalties, and the venture firm Hambros Technology Trust holding 5%. According to the UK Secretary of State for Industry, "the bid submitted by Racal-Millicom Ltd … provided the best prospect for early national coverage by cellular radio."

Vodafone was launched on 1 January 1985 under the new name of Racal-Vodafone (Holdings) Ltd, with its first office based in the Courtyard in Newbury, Berkshire, and shortly thereafter Racal Strategic Radio was renamed Racal Telecommunications Group Limited. The first non-Vodafone employee to make a UK mobile phone call was comedian Ernie Wise, from St Katharine Docks, London on 1 January 1985. On 29 December 1986, Racal Electronics issued shares to the minority shareholders of Vodafone worth £110 million, and Vodafone became a fully owned brand of Racal.

On 26 October 1988, Racal Telecom, majority held by Racal Electronics, went public on the London Stock Exchange with 20% of its stock floated. The successful flotation led to a situation where Racal's stake in Racal Telecom was valued more than the whole of Racal Electronics. Under stock market pressure to realise full value for shareholders, Racal demerged Racal Telecom in 1991.

Vodafone Group, then Vodafone Airtouch: 1991 to 2000
On 16 September 1991, Racal Telecom was demerged from Racal Electronics as Vodafone Group, with Gerry Whent as its CEO.

In July 1996, Vodafone acquired the two-thirds of Talkland it did not already own for £30.6 million. On 19 November 1996, in a defensive move, Vodafone purchased for £77 million Peoples Phone, a 181-store chain whose customers were overwhelmingly using Vodafone's network. In a similar move the company acquired the 80% that it did not already own of Astec Communications, a service provider with 21 stores.

In January 1997, Whent retired and Chris Gent took over as CEO. In the same year, Vodafone introduced its Speechmark logo, composed of a quotation mark in a circle, with the Os in the Vodafone logotype representing opening and closing quotation marks and suggesting conversation.

On 29 June 1999, Vodafone completed its purchase of American service provider AirTouch Communications, Inc. and changed its name to Vodafone Airtouch plc. The merged company commenced trading on 30 June 1999. The acquisition gave Vodafone a 35% share of Mannesmann, owner of the largest German mobile network. To gain antitrust approval for the merger, Vodafone sold its 17.2% stake in Mannesmann's German competitor, E-Plus Mobilfunk.

On 21 September 1999, Vodafone agreed to merge its US wireless assets with those of Bell Atlantic Corp to form Verizon Wireless. The merger was completed on 4 April 2000, just a few months prior to Bell Atlantic's merger with GTE to form Verizon Communications, Inc.

In November 1999, Vodafone made an unsolicited bid for Mannesmann, which was rejected. Vodafone's interest in Mannesmann had been increased by the latter's purchase of Orange, the UK mobile operator. Gent would later say Mannesmann's move into the UK broke a "gentleman's agreement" not to compete in each other's home territory. The hostile takeover provoked strong protest in Germany, and a "titanic struggle" which saw Mannesmann resist Vodafone's efforts. However, on 3 February 2000, the Mannesmann board agreed to an increased offer of £112 billion, then the largest corporate merger ever. The EU approved the merger in April 2000 after Vodafone agreed to divest the 'Orange' brand, which was acquired in May 2000 by France Télécom.

Vodafone Group plc: 2000 to present

On 28 July 2000, the Company reverted to its former name, Vodafone Group plc.

On 17 December 2001, Vodafone introduced the concept of "Partner Networks", by signing TDC Mobil of Denmark. The new concept involved the introduction of Vodafone international services to the local market, without the need of investment by Vodafone. The concept would be used to extend the Vodafone brand and services into markets where it did not have stakes in local operators. Vodafone services would be marketed under the dual-brand scheme, where the Vodafone brand is added at the end of the local brand. (i.e., TDC Mobil-Vodafone etc.)

Vodafone sponsored the Premier League team Manchester United F.C. in football from 2000 until the 2005-06 season.

In 2007, Vodafone entered into a title sponsorship deal with the McLaren Formula One team (previously Vodafone sponsored Scuderia Ferrari in 2002 until 2006), which traded as "Vodafone McLaren Mercedes" until the sponsorship ended at the end of the 2013 season.

On 1 December 2011, it acquired the Reading-based Bluefish Communications Ltd, an ICT consultancy company. The acquired operations formed the nucleus of a new Unified Communications and Collaboration practice within its subsidiary Vodafone Global Enterprise, which was to focus on implementing strategies in cloud computing, and strengthen its professional services offering.

In April 2012, Vodafone announced an agreement to acquire Cable & Wireless Worldwide (CWW) for £1.04 billion. The acquisition gave Vodafone access to CWW's fibre network for businesses, enabling it to offer unified communications to enterprises. On 18 June 2012, Cable & Wireless' shareholders voted in favour of the Vodafone offer.

On 2 September 2013, Vodafone announced it would be selling its 45% stake in Verizon Wireless to Verizon Communications for $US130 billion. With the proceeds from the deal, it announced a £19 billion Project Spring initiative to improve network quality in Europe and emerging markets, such as India.

In June 2017, the company took measures to prevent its advertising from appearing within outlets focused on creating and sharing hate speech and fake news.

In January 2020, Vodafone confirmed that it has pulled out of Diem Association (known as Libra Association at the time), the governing council for the Facebook-created global digital currency initiative.

Operations
Following a period of worldwide expansion which began in 1999, in the 2010s Vodafone entered a period of retrenchment and simplification of its operations. Its operating companies are in Europe, Africa, India and Turkey, while in other continents and countries it has partner agreements with local network operators.

Africa

Egypt
In November 1998, the Vodafone Egypt network went live under the name Click GSM, and was rebranded to Vodafone in 2002.

On 8 November 2006, the company announced a deal with Telecom Egypt, resulting in further co-operation in the Egyptian market and increasing its stake in Vodafone Egypt. After the deal, Vodafone Egypt was 55% owned by the group, while the remaining 45% was owned by Telecom Egypt.

On 29 January 2020, Saudi Telecom Company (STC) and the Vodafone Group signed a Memorandum of Understanding for the sale of Vodafone's entire 55 percent stake in Vodafone Egypt to STC. With the sale, Vodafone will be exiting Egypt (as a telecom operator) as the rest of the 45 percent stake in Vodafone Egypt is owned by Telecom Egypt. Telecom Egypt has said that it has no plans to sell its stake.

On 21 December 2020, Vodafone announced that its discussions with STC regarding the sale of Vodafone's 55% shareholding in Vodafone Egypt have been terminated and that Vodafone would stay in the Egyptian market.

South Africa (Vodafone)
On 3 November 2004, the company announced that its South African affiliate Vodacom had agreed to introduce Vodafone's international services, such as Vodafone live! and partner agreements, to its local market.

In November 2005, Vodafone announced that it was in exclusive talks to buy a 15% stake of VenFin in Vodacom Group, reaching agreement the following day. Vodafone and Telkom then had a 50% stake each in Vodacom. Vodafone now owns 57.5% of Vodacom after purchasing a 15% stake from Telkom.

On 9 October 2008, the company offered to acquire an additional 15% stake in Vodacom Group from Telkom. The finalised details of the agreement were announced on 6 November 2008. The agreement called for Telkom to sell 15 per cent of its 50 per cent stake in Vodacom to the group, and demerge the other 35 per cent to its shareholder. Meanwhile, Vodafone has agreed to make Vodacom its exclusive sub-Saharan Africa investment vehicle, as well as continuing to maintain the visibility of the Vodacom brand. The transaction closed in May/June 2009.

On 18 May 2009, Vodacom entered the JSE Limited stock exchange in South Africa after Vodafone increased its stake by 15% to 65% to take a majority holding, despite disputes by local trade unions.

In April 2011, Vodacom rebranded with the Vodafone logo.

Ghana
On 3 July 2008, Vodafone agreed to acquire a 70% stake in Ghana Telecom for $900 million. The acquisition was consummated on 17 August 2008. The same group-led consortium won the second fixed-line licence in Qatar on 15 September 2008.

On 15 April 2009, Ghana Telecom, along with its mobile subsidiary OneTouch, was rebranded as Vodafone Ghana.

Libya
On 24 February 2010, the group signed a partner network agreement with the second-largest operator in Libya, al Madar.

Cameroon

On 23 September 2016, Vodafone extended its activities to Cameroon by signing a partnership with Afrimax, a 4G-LTE telecommunications operator in Africa. Vodafone Cameroon Launched a "Youth Program" in the Universities to support and encourage the Cameroonian students. The partnership ceased to operate in September 2017 following the withdrawal of its license by the government.

Middle East

Bahrain
On 29 December 2003, Vodafone signed a Partner Network Agreement with Kuwait's MTC group. The agreement involved co-operation in Bahrain and the branding of the network as MTC-Vodafone.

Qatar
In December 2007, a Vodafone Group-led consortium was awarded the second mobile phone licence in Qatar under the name "Vodafone Qatar". Vodafone Qatar is located at QSTP, the Qatar Science & Technology Park. Commercial operations officially began on 1 March 2009. In February 2018 Vodafone Europe agreed to sell their stake in the Qatar joint venture.

On 25 November 2019, Vodafone in collaboration with Inseego Corp. introduced the 5G MiFi M1100 in Qatar. It is the first commercially available 5G mobile hotspot in the region.

United Arab Emirates
On 28 January 2009, the group announced a partner network agreement with Du, the second-largest operator in the United Arab Emirates. The agreement involved co-operation on international clients, handset procurement, mobile broadband etc.

Oman
In January 2021, Vodafone obtained a license to establish and operate public telecommunications services in Oman. In September 2021 Vodafone in Oman signed an agreement with Ericsson to deploy, operate and maintain 4G and 5G core and radio access (RAN) greenfield network and an agreement with Netcracker Technology to deploy Netcracker Digital BSS. Vodafone will be the third operator in the Sultanate of Oman.

The Americas

Canada 
Vodafone network Partner in Canada is Rogers Wireless.

Chile
On 11 May 2008, Vodafone sealed a trade agreement with the Chilean Entel PCS Chile, in which Entel PCS has access to the equipment and international services of Vodafone, and Vodafone will be one of the trademarks of Entel for the wireless business. This step will give the Vodafone brand access to a market of over 15 million people, currently divided among two companies: Telefonica Movistar, and Entel PCS.

Brazil
In August 2013, Vodafone has started the MVNO operation in Brazil, as a corporative M2M operator.

United States
In the United States, Vodafone previously owned 45% of Verizon Wireless in a joint venture with Verizon Communications, the country's largest mobile carrier. Vodafone branding was not used, however, as the CDMA network was not compatible with the GSM 900/1800 MHz standard used by Vodafone's other networks and as Vodafone did not have management control over Verizon Wireless. On 2 September 2013 Vodafone announced the sale of its stake to Verizon Communications for around $130 billion. In 2004, Vodafone made an unsuccessful bid for the entirety of AT&T Wireless; however, Cingular Wireless, at the time a joint venture of SBC Communications and BellSouth (both now part of AT&T Inc.), ultimately outbid Vodafone and took control of AT&T Wireless (the combined wireless carrier is now AT&T Mobility).

In 2013, Vodafone was considered for acquisition by U.S.-based AT&T. Ultimately, the deal did not move forward.

Asia

Japan
In 1999, J-Phone launched the J-sky mobile Internet service in response to DoCoMo's i-Mode service. It became Japan's third-largest mobile operator and was the first one to introduce camera phones in Japan. Vodafone then went on to acquire J-phone. In December 2002 J-Phone's 3G network went live. On 1 October 2003, J-Phone became 'Vodafone Japan', and J-Phone's mobile internet service J-Sky became Vodafone Live!. In March 2006, Vodafone sold Vodafone Japan to SoftBank. In October 2006, SoftBank changed Vodafone Japan's name to 'SoftBank Mobile'. On 17 March 2006, Vodafone announced an agreement to sell all its interest in Vodafone Japan to SoftBank for £8.9 billion, of which £6.8 billion would be received in cash upon completion of the deal. Vodafone Japan later changed its name to SoftBank Mobile. In November 2010, Vodafone divested its remaining Softbank shares.

India
On 28 October 2005, the company announced the acquisition of a 10 per cent stake in India's Bharti Enterprises, which operated the largest mobile phone network in India under the brand name Airtel. Then on 11 February 2007, the Company agreed to acquire a controlling interest of 67% in Hutch Essar for US$11.1 billion. At the same time, it agreed to sell back 5.6% of its Airtel stake to the Mittals; Vodafone would retain a 4.4% stake in Airtel. On 21 September 2007, Hutch was rebranded to Vodafone India. In May 2011, Vodafone Group Plc bought the remaining shares of Vodafone Essar from Essar Group Ltd for $5 billion. In October 2013, it was reported by Reuters that Vodafone planned to invest as much as $2 billion (£1.2 billion) to buy out minority shareholders in Vodafone India.

By late January 2017, Vodafone Group's unit in India and Idea Cellular Ltd were in preliminary talks to merge. And on 20 March 2017, Vodafone announced that it was merging its Indian business with Idea, India's third-largest network, to create the country's third largest operator with almost 270 million customers, accounting for 16% of the Indian cellphone service market. Vodafone would own 45.1 percent of the new operator and Idea's parent company, the Aditya Birla Group, 26 percent. The deal valued Vodafone India at the equivalent of $12.6 billion and Idea Cellular at the equivalent of $11.02 billion. The deal would enable Vodafone to move its Indian subsidiary off its balance sheet, cutting the British group's net debt by the equivalent of almost $8.25 billion. The Telecom ministry (DoT) cleared the Vodofone–Idea merger on 9 July 2018. On 31 August 2018, Vodafone Idea became a legal entity and the largest telecom service provider in India. On 7 September 2020, Vodafone Idea unveiled its new brand identity, 'Vi' which involves the integration of the company's erstwhile separate brands 'Vodafone' and 'Idea' into one unified brand.

Other Asia
On 3 November 2003, Singapore became a part of the community as M1 was signed as partner network. Then in April 2005, SmarTone changed the name of its brand to 'SmarTone-Vodafone', after both companies signed a Partner Network Agreement. In January 2006, Indonesia, Malaysia, and Sri Lanka were added to the Vodafone footprint as Vodafone Group signed a partner network agreement with Telekom Malaysia.
On 6 February 2007, along with the partnership with Digicel Caribbean (see below), Samoa was added as a Partner Market. On 6 February 2007, Vodafone Group signed a three-year partnership agreement with Digicel Group. The agreement, which includes Digicel's sister operation in Samoa, will result to the offering of new roaming capabilities. The two groups will also become preferred roaming partners of each other.

On 10 February 2008, Vodafone announced the launching of M-Paisa mobile money transfer service on Roshan's (Afghanistan's largest GSM operator) network: Afghanistan was added to the Vodafone footprint.

dtac in Thailand is signed as a partner network of the Group on 25 March 2009.

Nar Mobile in Azerbaijan was signed as a partner network on 22 July 2009, while Chunghwa Telecom of Taiwan was signed on 12 November 2009.

In September 2011, it was announced that Vodafone and Smartone would not renew their partnership in the Hong Kong market. Vodafone instead entered into an agreement with Hutchison Telecom, who operate the 3 brand. In the same year, M1 also ended their partnership in Singapore.

In February 2013, Vodafone together with China Mobile participated in bidding for one of the two newly opened Myanmar Mobile licences.

At the beginning of September 2014, the Vietnamese mobile operator Vinaphone signed a strategic co-operation agreement with Vodafone.

Europe

Vodafone Hungary was formed as a subsidiary company in July 1999. The acquisition of Mannesmann AG, completed on 12 April 2000, created subsidiaries in Germany and Italy, and increased the Group's indirect holding in SFR. The Vodafone brand in Italy was introduced as Omnitel-Vodafone in 2001, which became the primary brand in 2002; finally the current name Vodafone Italia was introduced in 2003, dropping "Omnitel" altogether.

In 2001, the company acquired Eircell, the largest wireless communications company in Ireland, from Eircom. Eircell was subsequently rebranded as Vodafone Ireland. In February 2002, Radiolinja of Finland joined Vodafone as a partner network. Later in December 2002, the Vodafone brand was introduced in the Estonian market following the signing of a Partner Network Agreement with the Estonian subsidiary of Radiolinja.

In January 2003, the company signed a group-wide partner agreement with mobilkom Austria and as a result Austria, Bulgaria, Croatia and Slovenia were added to the community. In April 2003, Og Vodafone was introduced in the Icelandic market. On 21 July 2003, Lithuania was added to the community, with the signing of a Partner Network Agreement with Bitė.

In February 2004, Vodafone signed Partner Network Agreements with Luxembourg's LuxGSM, and with Cyta of Cyprus. Cyta agreed to rename its mobile phone operations to Cytamobile-Vodafone. In April 2004, the company acquired a British airtime provider, Singlepoint, for £405m from John Caudwell's Caudwell Group, adding approximately 1.5 million customers and sites in Stoke-on-Trent to existing sites in Newbury (HQ), Birmingham, Warrington and Banbury. In November 2004, Vodafone introduced 3G services into Europe.

In June 2005, the Company bought the Czech mobile operator Oskar which was rebranded as Oskar-Vodafone.

On 28 October 2005, Connex in Romania was rebranded as Connex-Vodafone, and on 31 October 2005, the company reached an agreement to sell Vodafone Sweden to Telenor for approximately €1 billion. After the sale, Vodafone Sweden became a partner network.

In December 2005, Vodafone won an auction to buy Turkey's second-largest mobile phone company, Telsim, for US$4.5 billion. Early in January 2007, Telsim in Turkey adopted Vodafone dual branding as Telsim Vodafone, and on 1 April 2007, became Vodafone Turkey. In addition, Vodafone Turkey also provides service in Northern Cyprus.

In 2006, the Company rebranded its Stoke-on-Trent site as Stoke Premier Centre, a "centre of expertise" for the company dealing with customer care for its higher-value customers, technical support, sales and credit control. On 22 February 2006, the company announced that it was extending its footprint to Bulgaria with the signing of Partner Network Agreement with Mobiltel, which is part of the mobilkom Austria group.

In April 2006, the company announced that it had signed an extension to its Partner Network Agreement with Bitė Group, enabling its Latvian subsidiary  to become the latest member of Vodafone's global partner community. On 30 May 2006, Vodafone announced the then-biggest loss in British corporate history (£14.9 billion), and plans to cut 400 jobs; it reported one-off costs of £23.5 billion due to the revaluation of its Mannesmann subsidiary. On 24 July 2006, the respected head of Vodafone Europe, Bill Morrow, quit unexpectedly, and on 25 August 2006, the company announced the sale of its 25% stake in Belgium's Proximus for €2 billion. After the deal, Proximus remained part of the community as a Partner Network.

On 5 October 2006, Vodafone announced the first single-brand partnership with Og Vodafone which would operate under the name Vodafone Iceland, and on 19 December 2006, the company announced the sale of its 25% stake in Switzerland's Swisscom for CHF4.25 billion (£1.8 billion). After the deal, Swisscom would still be part of the community as a Partner Network. In December 2006, the Company completed the acquisition of Aspective, an enterprise applications systems integrator in the UK, signalling Vodafone's intent to grow a significant presence and revenues in the information and communication technologies (ICT) marketplace.

On 1 May 2007, Vodafone added Jersey and Guernsey to the community, as Airtel was signed as Partner Network in both crown dependencies. In June 2007, Vodafone UK began optimising web pages accessed through Vodafone Live!, which was criticised by The Register for interfering with mobile commerce websites. On 1 August 2007, Vodafone Portugal launched Vodafone Messenger, a service with Windows Live Messenger and Yahoo! Messenger. At the end of 2007, Vodafone Germany was ranked 6th in Europe by subscriber numbers, whilst its Italian operation was listed as 10th. Vodafone UK was ranked 13th, whilst Spain was listed in 16th place.

On 17 April 2008, Vodafone extended its footprint to Serbia as Vip mobile was added to the community as a Partner Network, and on 20 May 2008, the Company added VIP Operator as a Partner Network, thereby extending the global footprint to the North Macedonia.

On 30 October 2008, the company announced a strategic, non-equity partnership with Mobile TeleSystems (MTS) group of Russia. The agreement adds Russia, Armenia, Turkmenistan, Ukraine, and Uzbekistan to the group's footprint.

On 20 March 2009, it was announced that the group's Luxembourg partner has been changed: the agreement with LuxGSM was not renewed in favour of Tango, the Luxembourg unit of another partner network, Belgacom of Belgium.

On 4 April 2011, Vodafone sold its 44% stake in SFR, the second largest operator in France, to Vivendi for €7.95 billion.

In March 2013, the Spanish operations of Vodafone signed an agreement with Orange S.A. to co-invest €1 billion in the expansion of Spain's fibre-optic cable broadband network, which would enable Vodafone to reach an additional 6 million customers in Spain by 2017. On 24 June 2013, Vodafone announced it would be buying German cable company Kabel Deutschland. The takeover was valued at €7.7 billion, and was recommended over the bid of rival Liberty Global. In February 2014, Vodafone made an offer to acquire Spain's largest cable operator, ONO, for total consideration, including associated net debt acquired, of €7.2 billion.

In October 2015, Russia's Mobile TeleSystems and Vodafone expanded their 2008 strategic partnership; this resulted in the rebranding of MTS Ukraine to Vodafone Ukraine.

On 31 December 2016, Vodafone Group's Dutch operations merged with Liberty Global's Ziggo brand, creating VodafoneZiggo Group Holding B.V.

In April 2017, Vodafone was rated the worst mobile provider in the UK for the seventh year in succession in a "Which?" survey.

In 2019, Vodafone Group created a legally separate organisation comprising its European mobile towers. At the same time it was reported that the mobile towers business could be valued at about £10 billion. The mobile towers business was named Vantage Towers on 24 July 2020. Vantage Towers is headquartered in Düsseldorf, Germany with towers infrastructure in Germany, Spain, Greece, Portugal, Czech Republic, Romania, Hungary, Italy and Ireland comprising a total of 68,000 towers.

Oceania

Australia

In October 1993, Vodafone Australia's network went live. In December 2004, Vodafone Australia agreed to deploy high-speed MPLS backbone network built by Lucent Worldwide Services using Juniper hardware. In October 2005, it began launching 3G technology in Australia. On 5 September 2008, Vodafone purchased Australia's largest bricks and mortar mobile phone retailer Crazy John's adding 115 retail stores to its local operations.

On 9 February 2009, Vodafone Australia announced a merger with 3/Hutchison via a joint venture company VHA Pty Ltd, which would offer products under the Vodafone brand. On 19 June 2009, Vodafone-Hutchison Australia (VHA) announced the end of its outsourcing of retail operations. VHA committed to buying back and managing its entire retail operation, including 208 Vodafone-branded retail outlets Australia-wide. This project was slated to be completed by 1 September 2009.

On 31 August 2009, VHA enabled an extended 900 MHz 3G UMTS network which functions outside their 2,100 MHz 3G network, boosting Vodafone's 3G population coverage from around 8% to around 94% on dual-band 900/2,100 MHz 3G UMTS devices.

On 13 July 2020, VHA merged with TPG to create TPG Telecom Limited.

Fiji

In July 1994, Vodafone Fiji's network went live. In July 2014, Vodafone sold its 49% shareholding of Vodafone Fiji to The Fiji National Provident fund. Under the terms of the deal, Vodafone Fiji retained its branding under a Partner Market Agreement.

New Zealand

In July 1993, BellSouth New Zealand's network went live. In November 1998, Vodafone purchased BellSouth New Zealand, which later became Vodafone New Zealand. In August 2005, Vodafone launched 3G technology in New Zealand. On 9 October 2006, Vodafone New Zealand bought New Zealand's 3rd largest internet service provider, iHug. In October 2013, Vodafone began its rollout of 4G to provincial New Zealand, with the launch of the system in holiday hotspots around Coromandel. In 2019, Vodafone announced the sale of its New Zealand division to a consortium of investors; while Vodafone New Zealand is now independently owned, it retains a licensing agreement to continue use of the Vodafone name and logo in exchange for fee payments.

Vodafone Global Enterprise

Vodafone Global Enterprise is the business services division, and a wholly owned subsidiary of Vodafone Group. It was established in April 2007 to provide telecommunications and information technology services to large corporations.

The division offers integrated communications in cloud computing, unified communications and collaboration. Its services include domestic and international voice and data, machine-to-machine services, mobile email, mobile broadband, managed services, mobile payment and mobile recording.

In December 2011, it acquired the Reading-based Bluefish Communications Ltd, an ICT consultancy company. The acquired operations formed the nucleus of a new Unified Communications and Collaboration practice within VGE, working on cloud computing and professional services.

Vodafone Global Enterprise operates in over 65 countries, with "Northern Europe" (based in London, United Kingdom), "Central Europe", "Southern Europe and Africa", "Asia Pacific & Sub-Saharan Africa" (based in Singapore) and "Americas" geographical divisions. VGE's major customers include Deutsche Post, The Linde Group, Unilever, and Volkswagen Group.

Products and services

In October 2009, it launched Vodafone 360, a new internet service for the mobile, PC and Mac. This was discontinued in December 2011 after disappointing hardware sales. This was after the Director of Internet Services resigned in September 2010 tweeting "5 days before I leave Vodafone. Freedom beckons." In February 2010, Vodafone launched the world's cheapest mobile phone known as Vodafone 150, intended to sell for below $15 (£10) in the developing world. It was initially launched in India, Turkey and eight African countries including Lesotho, Kenya and Ghana.

Mobile money transfer services
In March 2007, Safaricom, which is part owned by Vodafone and the leading mobile communication provider in Kenya, launched mobile payment software developed by Vodafone.

By February 2008, the M-PESA money transfer system in Kenya had gained 1.6 million customers. By 2011 there were fourteen million M-Pesa accounts by which held 40 percent of the country's savings. Following M-PESA's success in Kenya, Vodafone announced that it was to extend the service to Afghanistan. The service here was launched on the Roshan network under the brand M-Paisa with a different focus to the Kenyan service. M-Paisa was targeted as a vehicle for microfinance institutions' (MFI) loan disbursements and repayments, alongside business-to-business applications such as salary disbursement. The Afghanistan launch was followed in April 2008 by the announcement of further a further launch of M-PESA in Tanzania, South Africa and India.

In February 2012, Vodafone announced a worldwide partnership with Visa.

Health services
In November 2009, Vodafone announced the creation of a new business unit focused on the emerging market (the application of mobile communications and network technologies to healthcare). One of its early success stories is with the Novartis-led "SMS for Life" project in Tanzania, for which Vodafone developed and deployed a text-message based system that enables all of the country's 4,600 public health facilities to report their levels of anti-malarial medications so that stock level data can be viewed centrally in real-time, enabling timely re-supply of stock. During the SMS for Life pilot, which covered 129 health facilities over six months, stock-outs dropped from 26% to 0.8%, saving thousands of lives.

Vodafone Foundation
The Vodafone Foundation is a recognised charity which supports and initiates projects which use mobile technology to benefit the vulnerable, using the slogan "Connecting for Good". They often work in collaboration with other charitable groups. Below are some examples of their initiatives:
 DreamLab, a volunteer computing mobile app developed in cooperation with Imperial College London and used to research on cancer, COVID-19, and other diseases
 TECSOS mobile phones have been adapted to allow victims of domestic violence to activate immediate contact with the emergency services if they are in danger
 Paediatric Epilepsy Remote Monitoring System a monitoring system that allows physicians to remotely make patient observations
 Safe Taxi System an initiative in Portugal that consists of technology that taxi drivers can use to alert police if they are in danger of being assaulted
 Learning with Vodafone Solution technology that allows teachers in India to use graphical and multi-media content to enhance their teaching
 The World of Difference programme successful applicants choose charities for which they work either full-time for two months or part-time for four months (minimum 15 hours a week). The charities are provided with £2,500, with each winner receiving the balance as a salary after NI and tax have been paid.

Advertising
Since 2017, Vodafone's global advertising has used the slogan "The future is exciting. Ready?". The previous slogan, since 2009, was "Power to You".

Sponsorships 
Vodafone's sponsorships include:

 Al Ahly SC (2002-11)
 Beşiktaş J.K. (2014-20)
 Manchester United F.C. (2000-06)
 Olympiacos F.C. (2006-09)

Corporate affairs

Senior management
Sir Gerald Whent, at that time an Executive with Racal Electronics plc, was responsible for the bid for a UK Cellular Network licence. The Mobile Telecoms division was de-merged, and was floated on the London Stock Exchange in October 1988 and Sir Gerald became Chief Executive of Racal Telecom plc. Over the next few years the company grew to become the UK's market leader, changing its name to Vodafone Group plc in the process.

Sir Christopher Gent took over as Chief Executive in January 1997, after Sir Gerald's retirement. Gent was responsible for transforming Vodafone from a small UK operator into the global operator, through the merger with the American AirTouch and the takeover of Germany's Mannesmann.

Arun Sarin was the driving force behind the company's move into emerging markets such as Asia and Africa, through the purchases such as that of Turkish operator Telsim, and a majority stake in Hutchison Essar in India.

The fourth CEO, Vittorio Colao, stepped up from Deputy Chief Executive in July 2008.

Financial results
Vodafone reports its results in accordance with International Financial Reporting Standards (IFRS). Financial performance has been as follows:

Criticisms

Tax avoidance
In September 2010, an investigation by Private Eye magazine revealed certain details of Vodafone's tax avoidance activities. It was reported that Vodafone routed the acquisition of Mannesmann through a Luxembourg subsidiary, set up to avoid paying tax on the deal, and continued to place its profits in Luxembourg. Following a long legal struggle with HMRC (during which a senior HMRC official, John Connors, switched sides to become head of tax at Vodafone), it was eventually agreed that Vodafone would pay £1.25 billion related to the acquisition. Based on Vodafone's accounts, experts have estimated the potential tax bill written off as a result of the negotiations was over £6 billion.

The news of this legal tax avoidance sparked angry protests, beginning in October 2010, outside Vodafone shops across the UK, organised under the banner of UK Uncut. The protests caused the closure of various stores across the UK.

In 2011, Private Eye magazine and The Bureau of Investigative Journalism alleged that Vodafone's Swiss branches were run by a single part-time bookkeeper. The report claimed hardly any business was done from there, indicating that the main purpose of the Zug office was tax avoidance. The report claimed the money was borrowed from the Swiss branch of the Luxembourg company, allowing it to take advantage of Luxembourg's laws, which exempts foreign branches of companies from tax, and Swiss laws, which almost completely exempt local branches of foreign companies. According to the expose, this would have otherwise generated a British tax bill of a little over £2 billion. It said Vodafone publishes a single, combined set of accounts for its Luxembourg subsidiaries and their Swiss branches. For the one company, profits worth £1.6 billion were taxed at less than 1% in 2011, and the profits are likely to have been attributed to Switzerland. In its response to these allegations, Vodafone has said the Swiss branch has not been involved in Vodafone's global financing for a number of years. It is, therefore, irrelevant in respect to global financing arrangements.

Vodafone was also assessed a US$2.5 billion tax over its acquisition of Hutchison Whampoa's Indian assets in 2007, a demand that it contests. In January 2012, the highest Indian court ruled that Vodafone is not liable for taxes and penalties of up to £2.8 billion. However, in February 2016 India's tax department sent Vodafone a renewed tax notice of £1.4bn. Following the siding of the Indian court with Vodafone in 2012, the government changed the law to allow firms to be retrospectively taxed. In September 2020, an international arbitration tribunal sided with Vodafone and ruled that India's efforts to claim past taxes was in violation of fair treatment under the bilateral investment protection pact between India and the Netherlands. India was asked by the tribunal to stop its efforts to claim the tax dues.

Communications blackout during the Arab Spring
Vodafone was implicated in the violent suppression of pro-democracy protests in Egypt's 2011 demonstrations. On 27 January, Vodafone, responsible for much of Egypt's telecommunication infrastructure, shut off all voice and data services for Egyptian citizens and businesses at the request of the Egyptian Government under Hosni Mubarak. On 28 January 2011, Vodafone complied with Egyptian government instructions to suspend Internet service "in selected areas" during a period of anti-Mubarak protests. The company issued a statement that "Under Egyptian legislation, the authorities have the right to issue such an order and we are obliged to comply with it." Vodafone also received public and media criticism for allowing the authorities to send mass pro-government messages via SMS over their network during the protests. One such message requested that "honest and loyal men" should "confront the traitors and criminals". Vodafone later issued a statement asserting that they had no choice but to allow the messages to be broadcast, and that they had complained to the Egyptian authorities about the practice. The Daily Telegraph of the UK reported, "The Egyptian government's action is unprecedented in the history of the internet." US-based Internet intelligence firm Renesys stated, "in an action unprecedented in Internet history, the Egyptian government appears to have ordered service providers to shut down all international connections to the Internet." Vodafone Group CEO Vittorio Colao said the company was obliged by law to comply with the instructions of the Egyptian government. At the company's annual general meeting, on 26 June, the campaign groups Access and FairPensions asked Vodafone to endorse a plan to prevent the company facing similar demands in the future.

Poor customer service
In Australia, particularly towards the end of 2010, Vodafone was heavily criticised due to allegations of poor customer service and severe technical inadequacies, which earned them their nickname "Vodafail" a website of the same name still exists. In response, they have developed a "new" network, and now provide a 30-day satisfaction guarantee.

In 2019, Vodafone was rated as the UK's worst mobile network provider for the eighth year in a row, in the eighth annual survey by consumer lobby group Which?.

Unlimited roaming costs on stolen phones
Vodafone UK, in common with other operators, has been criticised for holding customers on regular monthly billed contracts liable for almost unlimited roaming costs when their phones are stolen abroad, despite being seemingly able to limit costs of pay-as-you-go contracts.

Breaches of consumer protection rules
In October 2016, Vodafone was fined a record £4.6m by Ofcom for "serious" breaches of consumer protection rules.

In October 2017, Citizens Advice undertook a mystery shopping exercise which found that Vodafone, along with EE and Three, were not reducing customers' bills after fixed deals finished which meant that they were paying an extra £22 a month on average.

Surveillance infrastructure
In June 2014, Vodafone revealed information about their and other telecommunication operators' 'direct access systems', content data and metadata interception programmes globally.

Scam investigation 
In March 2019, the Indian investigation agency CBI filed a plea in the Supreme Court against Vodafone and Airtel alleging non cooperation in the Saradha chitfund scam. The court listed the matter for a hearing on 8 April 2019.

References

External links

 

 

 
Mobile phone companies of the United Kingdom
Telecommunications companies of the United Kingdom
Companies based in Newbury, Berkshire
Multinational companies headquartered in England
British companies established in 1991
Telecommunications companies established in 1991
Mobile phone manufacturers
1991 establishments in England
1980s initial public offerings 
Companies listed on the London Stock Exchange
Companies listed on the Nasdaq
Racal
British brands
Corporate spin-offs